Greyfriars, Richmond was a friary in North Yorkshire, England. Its bell tower still survives and dates from the 15th century. Its establishment as a friary is attributed to Ralph Fitz Randall in 1258. His heart was buried there in 1270. During the Crusades, Archbishop Romanus requested that two priests be sent from the friary, one there and one to Copeland (Cumberland). In 1304, an "apostate friar", Arthur of Hartlepool, upon being arrested, was sent to the friary for punishment. It was surrendered 19 January 1538, after it had accumulated five and a half acres of land from William de Huddeswell (in 1364) and John de Nevill (in 1383).

References

Further reading 
 
 
 

Monasteries in North Yorkshire